The Jharkhand Vidhan Sabha or the Jharkhand Legislative Assembly is the unicameral state legislature of Jharkhand state in eastern India. The seat of the Vidhan Sabha is at Ranchi, the capital of the state. The Vidhan Sabha comprises 81 Members of Legislative Assembly, directly elected from single-seat constituencies. 

Speaker Of The House : Shashank Shekhar Bhokta
Leader of  the House: Hemant Soren
Leader of the Opposition: Arjun Munda
Minister of Parliamentary Affairs: Rajendra Prasad Singh
Secretary-in-charge: Kaushal Kishore Prasad

List of assemblies

Composition 

Current assembly elections were held in the year 2009. Following is the final seat tally:

See also 
List of Chief Ministers of Jharkhand
Vidhan Sabha
List of states of India by type of legislature

References

3rd
2009 establishments in Jharkhand
2009